The Church of San Francisco de Sales (Spanish: Iglesia de San Francisco de Sales) is a church located in Madrid, Spain. It was declared Bien de Interés Cultural in 1996.

History 
At the beginning of the Spanish Civil War the Fifth Regiment used the building of the Church of San Francisco de Sales as its headquarters.

See also 
Catholic Church in Spain
List of oldest church buildings

References 

Francisco de Sales
Bien de Interés Cultural landmarks in Madrid
Buildings and structures in Tetuán District, Madrid